The Fraser or Old Lisu script is an artificial abugida invented around 1915 by Sara Ba Thaw, a Karen preacher from Myanmar and improved by the missionary James O. Fraser, to write the Lisu language. It is a single-case (unicameral) alphabet. It was also used for the Naxi language, e.g. the 1932 Naxi Gospel of Mark and used in the Zaiwa or Atsi language e.g. the 1938 Atsi Gospel of Mark.

The script uses uppercase letters from the Latin script (Except for the letter Q) and rotated versions thereof (Except for the letters M, Q and W), to write consonants and vowels. Tones and nasalization are written with Roman punctuation marks, identical to those found on a typewriter. Like the Indic abugidas, the vowel  is not written. However, unlike those scripts, the other vowels are written with full letters.

The local Chinese government in Nujiang de facto recognized the script in 1992 as the official script for writing in Lisu, although other Lisu autonomous territories continue to use the New Lisu.

Consonants
Note: You may need to download a Lisu capable Unicode font if not all characters display.

Initial glottal stop is only written when the inherit vowel  follows, and just like all consonants, the inherit vowel suffix  must not be written as that would indicate another  follows ( instead of ).
  represents a "vowel" in the Naxi language, presumably a medial , and a consonant in the Lisu language .
  only occurs in an imperative particle.
  is used only in Naxi language.

Vowels

**Only written after a syllable (consonant letter) to indicate a second vowel.

When consonant ꓠꓬ, ꓬ is used with vowel ꓬꓱ, ꓬ, without being ambiguous only one ꓬ is written.

Tones
Tones are written with standard punctuation.

*It is not clear how the  mid tone differs from the unmarked mid tone.

The apostrophe indicates nasalization. It is combined with tone marks.

The understrike (optionally a low macron) indicates the Lisu "A glide", a contraction of  without an intervening glottal stop. The tone is not always falling, depending on the environment, but is written  regardless.

Unicode

The Fraser script was added to the Unicode Standard in October, 2009 with the release of version 5.2.

The Unicode block for the Fraser script, called 'Lisu', is U+A4D0–U+A4FF:

An additional character, the inverted Y used in the Naxi language, was added to the Unicode Standard in March, 2020 with the release of version 13.0.  It is in the Lisu Supplement block (U+11FB0–U+11FBF):

See also
OMF International

References

External links
Omniglot entry on Fraser script
Proposal for encoding the Old Lisu script in the BMP of the UCS
Lisu Unicode, Open source font for users of the Lisu script
Issues in orthography development and reform by David Bradley
Sample text from Michael Everson's website

Alphabets
Loloish languages
Languages of China
Languages of India
Languages of Myanmar
Languages of Thailand